Virginville is an unincorporated community in Brooke County, West Virginia, United States.

A post office called Virginville was established in 1907, and remained in operation until 1973. The community's name is derived from "Virginia".

References

Unincorporated communities in Brooke County, West Virginia
Unincorporated communities in West Virginia